Componocancer roberti is an unusual species of fossil crab described in 2008. It lived in the Albian age (Early Cretaceous) in what is now Montana. The species is unlike any other described crab, and is therefore placed in its own family and superfamily.

References

Crabs
Early Cretaceous crustaceans
Monotypic decapod genera
Fossils of Montana
Albian genera
Cretaceous Montana
Cretaceous arthropods of North America
Early Cretaceous animals of North America